The Mekong Delta Rice Research Institute (CLRRI), situated in Cần Thơ, Vietnam, is a governmental institution dedicated to agricultural research. The institute was established in 1-1977 under name of Center for agricultural Technology in Cuulong delta. It renamed in 1985 on name of CLRRI

References

External links
CLRRI

Rice research institutes
Agricultural organizations based in Vietnam
Cần Thơ
Soil and crop science organizations
1977 establishments in Vietnam
Research institutes established in 1977